The Roman Catholic Diocese of Port-de-Paix, erected 3 October 1861, is a suffragan of the Archdiocese of Cap-Haïtien.

Bishops

Ordinaries
Paul-Marie Le Bihain, S.M.M. (1928–1935)
Albert-Marie Guiot, S.M.M. (1936–1975)
Rémy Augustin, S.M.M. (1978–1982)
François Colimon, S.M.M. (1982–2008)
Pierre-Antoine Paulo, O.M.I. (2008–2020)
Charles Peters Barthelus (2020–present)

Coadjutor bishops
Rémy Jérôme Augustin, S.M.M. (1966-1978)
François Colimon, S.M.M. (1978-1982)
Pierre-Antoine Paulo, O.M.I. (2001-2008)

References

External links and references

GCatholic.org page for this diocese

Port-de-Paix
Port-de-Paix
Port-de-Paix
1861 establishments in Haiti
Roman Catholic Ecclesiastical Province of Cap-Haïtien